"The Time in Between" is a song by Cliff Richard and the Shadows, released as a single in August 1965. It peaked at number 22 on the UK Singles Chart.

Release
Originally a French song, "The Time in Between" was written by Georges Aber, guitarist Micky Jones (later known for playing in rock band Foreigner) and drummer Thomas Brown. The Shadows were thinking of recording it by themselves, but "when Cliff heard it he was so enthusiastic about it that [they] passed it over to him". The song was recorded at the Estúdios Valentim de Carvalho whilst the group were in Portugal. It was released single with the B-side "Look Before You Love", written by Chris Arnold, David Martin and Geoff Morrow. Richard "was convinced ["The Time in Between"] was going to be a smash", saying "I think we did a really good job on the track. And yet it didn't get higher than 20 [on the UK Singles Chart]".

Reviewing for New Musical Express, Derek Johnson wrote: "It's medium fast, with Hank and Bruce providing a vocal harmony backing. It's a snappy number, full of life and buoyancy, and you've just got to keep moving to the beat. The melody content is both strong and appealing, while the Shads are in vital and vibrant form".

Track listing
7": Columbia / DB 7660
 "The Time in Between" – 2:58
 "Look Before You Love" – 2:57

Personnel
 Cliff Richard – vocals
 Hank Marvin – lead guitar, backing vocals
 Bruce Welch – rhythm guitar, backing vocals
 John Rostill – bass guitar
 Brian Bennett – drums
 Norrie Paramor – piano

Charts

References

Cliff Richard songs
1965 singles
1965 songs
Songs written by Georges Aber
Songs written by Mick Jones (Foreigner)

Columbia Graphophone Company singles
Song recordings produced by Norrie Paramor